The Raid on Canso took place on 22 September  – November 22, 1776 during the American Revolutionary War. The raid involved American Continental Navy captain John Paul Jones attacking Canso, Nova Scotia (now part of Canada) and the surrounding fishing villages.

Background
During the American Revolution, Americans regularly attacked Nova Scotia by land and sea. American privateers devastated the maritime economy by raiding many of the coastal communities, such as the numerous raids on Liverpool and on Annapolis Royal.<ref>Roger Marsters (2004). Bold Privateers: Terror, Plunder and Profit on Canada's Atlantic Coast" , p. 87-89</ref>

George Washington's Marblehead Regiment raided Charlottetown, now in Prince Edward Island, on 17 November 1775, and three days later they raided Canso Harbor.

Raid
On September 22, 1776, the American privateer John Paul Jones attacked Canso. Captain Jones commanded . He destroyed fifteen vessels and damaged much property on shore. There he recruited men to fill the vacancies created by manning his prizes, burned a British fishing schooner, sank a second, and captured a third besides a shallop which he used as a tender. pp.77-78

Jones then pillaged the community of Petit-de-Grat and Arichat on Isle Madame, Nova Scotia. The nine ships (300 men) immediately surrendered.  On the evening of September 25, a gale drove three of the prizes on to shore, destroying them.  (The remaining prizes were Alexander, Kingston Packet, Success, and Defence.) Jones destroyed John Robin’s fishing business when they plundered and razed the entire establishment.  The business of John Robin ended and he did not return until after the war. Jones then sailed to Boston.

Boats from Alfred'' took a raiding party ashore; his crews burned a transport bound for Canada with provisions, and a warehouse full of whale oil, besides capturing a small schooner. In all, Jones took 6 prizes, 1 burned, 1 confiscated.  

Captain Jones then went on to present-day Sydney, Nova Scotia to free 300 Americans imprisoned in the British coalmines.

Aftermath

Again in 1779, American privateers destroyed the Canso fisheries, worth $50,000 a year to England.

American privateers remained a threat to Nova Scotian ports for the rest of the war. For example, after a failed attempt to raid Chester, Nova Scotia, American privateers struck again in the Raid on Lunenburg in 1782.

See also
 
Military history of Nova Scotia

Notes

References
Primary Sources
  John Paul Jones Account of the Raid

Secondary Sources
 John Brebner. The Neutral Yankees of Nova Scotia. Columbia University. 1937.
 John Paul Jones: A Sailor's Biography by Samuel Eliot Morison, 1959 
 John Paul Jones Raids Arichat, 1776
 John Dewar Faibisy.  Privateering and Piracy: The Effects of  New England Raiding Upon Nova Scotia During the American Revolution, 1775-1883. University of Massachusetts. 1972. pp. 41-44
William Bell Clark, George Washington’s Navy (Baton Rouge: Louisiana State University Press, 1960, Chapters 5, 7. 
 Gardner W. Allen, A NAVAL HISTORY OF THE AMERICAN REVOLUTION (Boston, 1913), Chapter 17.
 
 
 
 Guysborough Sketches and Essays. 

Canso
Canso
Privateering in the American Revolutionary War
Canso
Maritime history of Canada
Military history of Nova Scotia
Military history of New England
1776 in Prince Edward Island
Canso (1776)